José Manuel Durand Laguna (November 7, 1885 – February 1, 1965) was an Argentine football manager who was manager of the Paraguay national team at Copa América 1921 and 1929 and the 1930 FIFA World Cup.

Laguna was born in Buenos Aires, Argentina, and died, aged 79, in Asunción, Paraguay.

References

1880s births
1965 deaths
Footballers from Buenos Aires
Argentine footballers
Argentine football managers
Argentine expatriate football managers
1930 FIFA World Cup managers
Paraguay national football team managers
Club Nacional managers
Club Atlético Huracán managers
Expatriate football managers in Paraguay
Argentine expatriate sportspeople in Paraguay
Association football midfielders